Benjamin Davis Jr. may refer to
Benjamin J. Davis Jr. (1903–1964), New York Communist city councilman, imprisoned for violations of the Smith Act
Benjamin O. Davis Jr. (1912–2002), American general, commander of the World War II Tuskegee Airmen

See also
 Benjamin Davis (disambiguation)